Hausser or Häusser is a surname, and may refer to:

 Elias David Häusser (1687–1745), German-Danish architect
 Gérard Hausser (born 1939), former French footballer
 Ludwig Häusser (1818–1867), German historian
 Paul Hausser (1880–1972), German officer in World War II